Cold Mountain may refer to:

Art, entertainment and media

 Cold Mountain (novel), a 1997 novel by Charles Frazier
 Cold Mountain, fictional name for Bethel community of Canton, North Carolina
 Cold Mountain (film), a 2003 film adaptation of Charles Frazier's novel
 Cold Mountain (soundtrack), the soundtrack to the film
 Cold Mountain (opera), a 2015 opera by Jennifer Higdon
 Cold Mountain Penitentiary, the prison featured in the novel The Green Mile and its film adaptation
 Cold Mountain, a series of paintings by American abstract artist Brice Marden
 Cold Mountain, a seasonal craft beer by Highland Brewing Company of Asheville, NC

Places
 Cold Mountain (North Carolina), located within the Pisgah National Forest
 Cold Mountain (Slovenia) (Slovene: Mrzla gora), 2,203 m, located in the Kamnik Alps
 Cold Mountain (California), a mountain in Tuolumne County, within Yosemite National Park

People
 Hanshan (poet), a Chinese poet whose name literally means "Cold Mountain"

See also
 Mendonça (disambiguation), a Portuguese surname that means "cold mountain"
Mendoza (disambiguation), a Spanish surname that means "cold mountain"